Kameli Soejima (副島 亀里, Soejima Kameli, born June 1, 1983) is a Fijian born Japanese rugby union player. He represents Japan in rugby sevens and made his debut at the 2014 Dubai Sevens. He is Japan's top try-scorer in the 2015–16 World Rugby Sevens Series, and was also one of their top try-scorers last season.

Soejima was selected for the Japanese sevens squad to the 2016 Summer Olympics in Brazil.

References

External links 
 Japan RFU Player Profile
 

1983 births
Living people
Male rugby sevens players
Japanese rugby union players
Fijian expatriates in Japan
Rugby sevens players at the 2016 Summer Olympics
Olympic rugby sevens players of Japan
Japanese rugby sevens players
Japan international rugby sevens players
Rugby union players at the 2018 Asian Games
Asian Games silver medalists for Japan
Medalists at the 2018 Asian Games
Asian Games medalists in rugby union
Rugby sevens players at the 2020 Summer Olympics
Coca-Cola Red Sparks players
Rugby union wings
People from Labasa